Yehuda Gilad may refer to:
Yehuda Gilad (musician), American professor of the clarinet
Yehuda Gilad (politician), Israeli rabbi and politician